Alan M. Casavant (born July 26, 1952) is an American politician from Maine. Casavant, a Democrat, represented  District 137 in the Maine House of Representatives from 2006 to 2014. District 137 comprised portions of Biddeford and Kennebunk. Casavant was unable to seek re-election in 2014 due to term-limits. Casavant is also the elected Mayor of Biddeford, holding that position since November 2011 when he defeated incumbent Mayor Joanne Twomey. His support grew in the 2017 election. He served as a Biddeford City Council member from 1976 to 1992. He retired as a teacher at Biddeford High School in 2012.

Casavant earned a B.S. (Bachelors's Degree of Science) in psychology from the University of Maine in 1974. In 2004, he earned a M.A. in American and New England Studies from the University of Southern Maine.

References

1952 births
21st-century American politicians
Educators from Maine
Living people
Mayors of Biddeford, Maine
Democratic Party members of the Maine House of Representatives
University of Maine alumni
University of Southern Maine alumni